An Essay on Liberation is a 1969 book by the Frankfurt School philosopher Herbert Marcuse.

Summary

Marcuse argues that advanced industrial society has rendered the traditional conception of human freedom obsolete, and outlines new possibilities for contemporary human liberation.

Publication history
An Essay on Liberation was first published by Beacon Press in 1969.

Reception
The author Brian Easlea writes that Marcuse, having in the past been attacked by Marxists for his "quite unambiguous indictment of science and perhaps feeling that he had directed too much attention away from the rulers of advanced industrial society", apparently "reversed direction" in An Essay on Liberation by endorsing science and technology as "great vehicles of liberation".

References

Bibliography
Books

 
 

1969 non-fiction books
Beacon Press books
Contemporary philosophical literature
English-language books
Frankfurt School
Social philosophy literature
Works by Herbert Marcuse